The  was the first Okinawan newspaper. It was founded in 1893 by Shō Jun, a former prince of the Ryūkyū Kingdom, and is still in publication today.

Historian George H. Kerr says of the newspaper, upon its founding, that it "strengthened leadership and promoted the development of informed opinion on matters of public concern". It has also been described as speaking for the former ruling class of the kingdom. Editor-in-chief Ōta Chōfu, along with others from the newspaper, played a role in the Kōdō-kai Movement, arguing for leadership of the prefecture to remain hereditary within the Shō family, and opposing the Freedom and People's Rights Movement led in Okinawa by, among others, Jahana Noboru.

The Ryūkyū Shimpō company involved itself in development and modernization efforts in the island prefecture, spurring agricultural production and innovation by hosting competitions and exhibitions, and arranged in 1915 for the first demonstration of an airplane in Okinawa.

Originally published every other day, it became a daily newspaper in 1906. During World War II, as the result of the national government's Newspaper Unification Policy, the paper was combined with the Okinawa Asahi and Okinawa Daily News (Okinawa Nippō) into the Okinawa Shimpō, and did not resume publication under the name "Ryūkyū Shimpō" until after the end of the war.

Today, it has the largest print-run of newspapers in Okinawa with both morning and evening editions, and the newspaper company is connected to a number of other businesses, including Ryūkyū Shimpō Shipping, Ryūkyū Shimpō Development, and

References

1893 establishments in Japan
Publications established in 1893
Daily newspapers published in Japan
Japanese-language newspapers
Mass media in Okinawa Prefecture
Companies based in Okinawa Prefecture